Ajmer Singh (born 1948) is an Indian Sikh political thinker and author in the Punjabi language. He was a naxalite for the majority of his life, working underground for 31 years. He is currently active in Sikh ideology and history, writing a series of books on Sikh history, and has been termed a Khalistan proponent. He is said to have been a deep influence on Deep Sidhu, the erstwhile founder of the Sikh activist organisation Waris Punjab De.

Early life 
Ajmer Singh was born on 15 June 1948 in Mandi Kalan, Bathinda district in Punjab, India. His parents were Gurdial Kaur and Bir Singh.

He enrolled for the Bachelor of Engineering at the Guru Nanak Dev Engineering Coll in Ludhiana. But he left with his studies incomplete and joined the Naxalite movement. He is said to have become the leader of Naxalites in Punjab and remained underground for 31 years, 1970 to 2001.

Literary career 
Ajmer Singh was transformed after the events of 1984, when the Indian government launched an attack on the Golden Temple to flush out the militants holed up there. He visited Delhi two weeks later and drew conclusions about its political motivations. He wrote reports in his Leftist organisation's monthly newspaper and is said to have reconnected with his Sikh beliefs.

Afterwards, he wrote a series of four books on the history of Sikh politics in the 20th century, which included one on the 1984 developments termed "The unimaged catastrophe" and another termed the "Ideological encirclement of Sikhs".

He also dug into the history of the Ghadar Movement of the early 20th century, and came up with the conclusion that it was primarily a Sikh revolutionary movement rather than an Indian nationalist movement. He wrote a book highlighting his interpretation.

Works 
 Kis Bidh Ruli Patshahi: Sikh Rajniti Da Dukhant, Singh Brothers 2009. 
  1984 - Anchitvia Kaihair [1984 – The unimagined catastrophe], Singh Brothers, 2012. .
 Vihvin Sadi Di Sikh Rajniti [Sikh politics in the twentieth century], Singh Brothers, 2014. 
 Teeje Ghallughare Ton Baad Sikhan Di Sidhantak Gherabandi [Ideological encirclement of Sikhs after third holocaust], Singh Brothers, 2015. .
 Gadari Babe Kaun Sun? Anmattiya De Kur Dahvihayan Da Khandan [Who were Ghadari Babas? Rejection of distorted claims], Singh Brothers, 2013. .
 Tufanan Da Shah Aswar Shaheed Kartar Singh Sarabha''', Singh Brothers, 2017. 
 Shaheed Kartar Singh Srabha, Tarkbharti Publications, 2018. 
 Shaheed Jaswant Singh Khalra: Soch, Sangharsh Te Shahadat'', Singh Brothers 2020.

References

External links 
 Writer Ajmer Singh picked up by Police, The Times of India, 6 January 2006.

1948 births
Punjabi-language writers
Activists from Punjab, India